Sadaung is a village in Shwebo District in south-western Sagaing Region in Burma (Myanmar).  It is in the Mu River drainage basin.  It is located 2.5 km south-west of Halin Taungbo, in the foothills of the Mawdaw Mountains.

Notes

External links
 "Sadaung Map — Satellite Images of Sadaung" Maplandia

Populated places in Sagaing Region